The 1981 NCAA Rifle Championship was the second annual tournament to determine the national champion of NCAA co-ed collegiate rifle shooting. The championship was held at the U.S. Military Academy in West Point, New York during March 1981. 

Tennessee Tech, with a team score of 6,139, retained the national title, their second. West Virginia again finished in second, with 6,136. The Golden Eagles were coached by James Newkirk.

Kurt Fitz-Randolph (Tennessee Tech) claimed the individual titles for smallbore, and John Rost (West Virginia) won the championship for air rifle.

Qualification
Since there is only one national collegiate championship for rifle shooting, all NCAA rifle programs (whether from Division I, Division II, or Division III) were eligible. A total of 10 teams ultimately contested this championship.

Results
Scoring:  The championship consisted of 120 shots by each competitor in smallbore and 40 shots per competitor in air rifle.

Team title

Individual events

References

NCAA Rifle Championship
NCAA Rifle Championships
1981 in shooting sports
NCAA Rifle Championships